Rade Tošić (born March 31, 1965) is a former Bosnian football player. He was born in the Ugljevik region of Yugoslavia, now a part of Bosnia and Herzegovina.

Club career
Tošić played for FK Sloboda Tuzla, NK Hajduk Split and Red Star Belgrade in the Yugoslav First League.

International career
He made one appearance for Yugoslavia, in a March 1988 friendly match against Italy, coming on as a late substitute for Vujadin Stanojković.

References

External links

 Profile at Serbian federation site

1965 births
Living people
Sportspeople from Tuzla
Serbs of Bosnia and Herzegovina
Association football defenders
Yugoslav footballers
Yugoslavia international footballers
Bosnia and Herzegovina footballers
FK Sloboda Tuzla players
HNK Hajduk Split players
Red Star Belgrade footballers
Yugoslav First League players
CP Mérida footballers
CD Castellón footballers
Segunda División players
Segunda División B players
Tercera División players
Bosnia and Herzegovina expatriate footballers
Expatriate footballers in Spain
Bosnia and Herzegovina expatriate sportspeople in Spain